Narcisse A. Gagnon (February 11, 1835 – November 20, 1903) was a Canadian politician. He served in the Legislative Assembly of New Brunswick as a member from Madawaska County.

References 

1835 births
1903 deaths